The 2013–14 season is FK Bregalnica Štip's 4th consecutive season in First League. This article shows player statistics and all official matches that the club will play during the 2013–14 season.

Squad
As of 11 August 2013

Competitions

First League

Results summary

Results

Table

Macedonian Cup

Statistics

Top scorers

References

FK Bregalnica Štip seasons
Bregalnica Stip